The 2010 FIBA World Championship was the 16th FIBA World Championship, the international basketball world championship contested by the men's national teams. The tournament ran from 28 August to 12 September 2010. It was co-organised by the International Basketball Federation (FIBA), Turkish Basketball Federation and the 2010 Organising Committee. It was considered as prestigious a competition as the Olympic Basketball Tournament. The tournament was hosted by Turkey.

For the third time (after the 1986 and 2006 tournaments), the World Championship had 24 competing nations. As a result, the group stage games were played in four cities, and the knockout round was hosted by Istanbul.

The United States won the tournament for their fourth time after going undefeated in the Opening Round and beating host Turkey in the final.

The draw for the Championship took place on 15 December 2009 in Istanbul. Teams were drawn into four preliminary round groups of six teams each. Teams first played a round-robin schedule, with the top sixteen teams advancing to the knockout stage.

Bid 

Three bids from six countries – France, Turkey, and a joint bid from former Yugoslav republics Bosnia and Herzegovina, Croatia, Serbia and Montenegro, and Slovenia – made their final presentation during the FIBA's 20-member Central Board in Kuala Lumpur, Malaysia, on 5 December 2004. Previously, Australia and New Zealand, Italy, Russia and Puerto Rico announced their intention to bid from the tournament, but withdrew their bids prior to the votes. France won the first round of voting, but Turkey eventually won the right to host after the joint bidders were knocked out in the first round.

The tournament was the first time that Turkey has hosted the event and marked the first World Championship held in Europe since the 1998 FIBA World Championship was held in Greece.

Venues 
Below is a list of the venues which hosted games during the 2010 FIBA World Championship. Each preliminary round group was hosted in a single arena in Kayseri (Group A), Istanbul (Group B), Ankara (Group C), and İzmir (Group D). The knockout phase then moved to Istanbul's Sinan Erdem Dome. Ankara Arena, completed in 2010, and Kadir Has Arena, completed in 2008, were built for the championships, while the other three arenas underwent renovations for the event.

Qualifying 

Turkey automatically qualified as the host country, and the United States also received an automatic berth for winning the 2008 Olympic men's basketball tournament.

Most other teams secured their places in continental qualifying tournaments (three from Africa, three from Asia, two from Oceania, four from the Americas, and six from Europe). FIBA invited four "wild card" teams to fill out the twenty-four team field.

Wild cards 

The four wild cards were determined by FIBA through criteria. For example, a team must have played in the Zone's qualification tournament to receive recommendation. Also, in order for every team to have an opportunity for a wild card, a maximum of three teams from any Zone can be allotted a wild card entry. Once these requirements are satisfied, FIBA then looks at other important factors. Those include popularity of basketball within the country, success of the team, and government support for the team's National Federation. As of 2009, FIBA now requires that wild card candidates pay a late registration fee to be considered.

Fourteen teams paid the 500,000 € fee to apply for one of the four wild card spots. FIBA then whittled down the teams to eight semifinalists – Cameroon, Germany, Great Britain, Korea, Lebanon, Lithuania, Nigeria, and Russia. On Saturday 12 December 2009, FIBA awarded Germany, Lebanon, Lithuania and Russia the four wild cards.

List of qualified teams 

The following 24 teams qualified for the final tournament (FIBA World Ranking at start of tournament in parentheses):

The draw for the championship took place in Istanbul on December 15, 2009.

Group Draw 

The draw held on 15 December divided the qualified teams into four groups of six, groups A, B, C, and D, as listed for the preliminary round. Aside from the fact that those teams in the same line would not be in the same preliminary round groups, there were no other restrictions on how teams may be drawn.

Squads 

At the start of tournament, all 24 participating countries had 12 players on their rosters. Final squads for the tournament were due on August 26, two days before the start of competition.

Angola and the United States were the only teams made up of entirely domestic players (Jordan and Russia each had 11 domestic players). Slovenia was the only team composed entirely of individuals playing outside the domestic league. The Canada squad also consisted entirely of individuals playing outside the country, but at that time Canada had no professional league operating exclusively in the country (a minor professional league was scheduled to begin play in 2011). The National Basketball Association, based in the U.S., has a Canadian team, and several minor leagues operate on both sides of the U.S.—Canada border. Four Canadian squad members played in U.S.-based competitions—two with U.S.-based NBA teams, and two for Gonzaga University's team. Forty-one NBA players were selected to compete in the tournament, the most of any league.

Preparation matches

Acropolis tournament 

Greece and Serbia both began the tournament shorthanded when each had two players suspended for their roles in a brawl at the World Championship tuneup Acropolis Tournament, held in mid-August. The two teams engaged in a chaotic brawl with 2:40 left when Greece's Antonis Fotsis threatened Serbia's Miloš Teodosić after Teodosić committed a foul. The fight spilled off the floor and into the locker room tunnel; the game was thus terminated with final score the score at the time of the interruption (74–73 for Greece). Serbian center Nenad Krstić was arrested and held overnight for throwing a chair in the brawl.

For their roles in the melee, Krstić was suspended for the first three games of the tournament, while Teodosić, and Greece's Fotsis and Sofoklis Schortsanitis were suspended for the first two games. Both Greek coach Jonas Kazlauskas and Serbian coach Dušan Ivković criticized FIBA for waiting until less than 48 hours before the tournament – over a week after the brawl – to announce the suspensions, citing the unfairness of playing shorthanded for the first games. Greece eventually won their first two games in spite of the suspensions, while Serbia won two of their first three games.

Bamberg Super Cup

Preliminary round 

The top four finishers in each of the four preliminary round groups advanced to the sixteen team, single-elimination knockout stage, where Group A teams would meet Group B teams and Group C would meet Group D. European teams proved the most successful in the first round, as nine of the ten teams advanced to the knockout stage (only Germany did not progress). Both Oceanian teams qualified for the next round, as did three of the five FIBA Americas teams. The three African and four Asian teams struggled, with only Angola and China reaching the knockout stage after each finished fourth place in their group.

There were few surprises in the early round; each team that advanced to the knockout stage was ranked in the top 20 of the FIBA World Ranking at the time of the tournament. Defending champions Spain struggled early, losing two of their first three games before recovering to finish second in Group D. Argentina and the United States, the two top teams in the FIBA rankings, both cruised to the knockout phase, as the United States went 5–0 and Argentina went 4–1, with their only loss coming to Number 5 ranked Serbia.

Tie-breaking procedure 

At the end of the preliminary round, any ties will be broken by the following criteria, ordered from the one that will be applied first to the last:
 Game results between tied teams
 Goal average between games of the tied teams
 Goal average for all games of the tied teams
 Drawing of lots

Group A (Kayseri)

Group B (Istanbul)

Group C (Ankara)

Group D (Izmir)

Final round (Istanbul)

Round of 16

Quarterfinals

5th–8th classification

Semifinals

Seventh place playoff

Fifth place playoff

Semifinals

Third place playoff

Final

Statistical leaders

Individual tournament highs 

Points

Rebounds

Assists

Blocks

Steals

Minutes

Individual game highs

Team tournament highs 

Offensive PPG

Defensive PPG

Rebounds

Assists

Steals

Blocks

Team game highs

Final rankings 

Method of breaking ties:
 Result of classification game
 Place in preliminary round group
 Winning percentage
 Overall points average

Awards

All-Tournament Team 

  Luis Scola
  Linas Kleiza
  Kevin Durant – MVP
  Hedo Türkoğlu
  Miloš Teodosić

Referees 

On August 18, 2010, FIBA named the forty referees that officiated at the tournament. Below are the referees, along with the first round group that each was assigned to:

Broadcasting

Rights 

FIBA announced that the championship will be shown in 183 countries, beating the record set be the 2006 championship which was 132. Countries that aired the championship for the first time were India and the United Kingdom, while Canada covered the event for the first time since hosting the 1994 FIBA World Championship.

TV ratings 

According to FIBA secretary general Patrick Baumann, the TV ratings for the 2010 championship exceeded the 2006 FIBA World Championship's and the FIBA EuroBasket 2009 numbers, with an expected audience of 800 million people in 200 countries, while 30 million people visited the official website.

The preliminary round game between China and Greece was watched by around 65 million Chinese.

The U.S. TV ratings for the Final between the U.S. and Turkey, on the other hand, was watched by less than 900,000 viewers in American cable network ESPN, worse than the average audience of the broadcast of the 2009-10 NBA season, but double than the airing of the first game of the 2010 WNBA Finals on its sister terrestrial network ABC which was aired on the same timeslot.

List of broadcasters 

TV broadcasters

See also 

 2010 FIBA World Championship for Women
 2010 Wheelchair Basketball World Championship

References

External links

 
 
 

 
2010
2010 in basketball
2010–11 in Turkish basketball
August 2010 sports events in Turkey
September 2010 sports events in Turkey
2010s in Ankara
2010 in Istanbul
2010s in İzmir
International basketball competitions hosted by Turkey